Michael H. Stone, M.D. (born October 27, 1933) is an American psychiatrist and Professor of Clinical Psychiatry at the Columbia University College of Physicians and Surgeons in New York City.

Early life and education 
Stone was born in Syracuse, New York, on October 27, 1933. He acquired his B.A. from Cornell University in 1954, where he was mentored by Professor Harry Caplan in Latin and Greek, and completed medical school at Cornell University in 1958. He was mentored by psychoanalyst Dr. Harold Searles from 1958 to 1963, and trained in hematology under Dr. Allyn Ley at Memorial Sloan-Kettering from 1961 to 1963. He completed training in the Columbia Psychoanalytic Institute in 1971, and from 1996 to 2000, was mentored in forensic psychiatry by Dr. Charles Smith.

Research 
Stone's work has lent support to the need for flexibility in the therapeutic approach to treating Borderline personality disorder, as advocated by Drs. John Livesley, John G. Gunderson and Thomas McGlashan. He has described long-term follow-up of patients diagnosed with Borderline Personality Disorder, 25–50 years after initial contact. In 2017, the American Academy of Psychoanalysis and Dynamic Psychiatry awarded him for a paper describing treatment recommendations for persons with this condition.

Stone is also recognized for refining the concept of psychopathy, as described by Dr. Robert D. Hare and Dr. David Cooke. From 2006 to 2007, he was the host of the Discovery Channel’s "Most Evil", a true crime program based upon the 22-point Gradations of Evil scale he developed to examine acts of violence which provoke the emotional reaction association commonly termed "evil". According to Stone, "evil" acts are generally shocking and horrible, bewildering, and premeditated, and involve wildly excessive degrees of suffering. His scale, which distinguishes acts with more "human" motivations, such as crimes of self-defense and passion, from violence associated with various degrees of psychopathy and sadism, was formally described in his 2009 book The Anatomy of Evil in 2009 and further delineated alongside clinical psychologist Dr. Gary Brucato in its follow-up volume, The New Evil: Understanding the Emergence of Modern Violent Crime, in 2019.
 
Stone is the author of 11 other books, including The Borderline Syndromes (1980) and Personality-Disordered Patients: Treatable and Untreatable (1996), as well as over 250 articles in professional journals. He has lectured throughout the United States and in forty other countries. Honors for his work have included the Chester Scrignar honorary lecture at Tulane in 2013; the Silverman Lecture at New York Presbyterian/Cornell Hospital in 2013; inclusion in the 2017 and 2018 editions of Who's Who in America; and the 2018 Visionary of the Year Award.

Personal life
Stone lives in New York City with his wife Beth. Both are patrons of the Metropolitan Opera and the New York City Ballet. Stone has two sons and three grandchildren.

References

1933 births
Living people
American forensic psychiatrists
Columbia University faculty
Cornell University alumni
Television personalities from Syracuse, New York